The Second Decade (Italian: Decennale secondo) is a poem by Italian Renaissance writer Niccolò Machiavelli. Published in 1509, it is an update to Machiavelli's earlier work The First Decade (Decennale Primo), published in 1504.

References

External links
Text of the poem in Italian

Works by Niccolò Machiavelli
1509 poems
Italian poems